The National Alliance for Youth Sports (NAYS) is a non-profit 501(c)(3) organization based in West Palm Beach, Florida, U.S.A.. NAYS provides a variety of programs and services for everyone involved in youth sports, including professional and volunteer administrators, volunteer coaches, officials, parents and young athletes.

Mission

NAYS seeks to make the sports experience safe, fun and healthy for all children. In addition, NAYS promotes the value and importance of sports and physical activities for the emotional, physical, social and mental development of youth. NAYS believes that participation in sports and activities develops important character traits and lifelong values. In addition, NAYS believes that the lives of youngsters can be positively impacted by their participation in sports and physical activities if the adults involved have proper training and information.

NAYS is committed to making sports safe and positive by providing programs and services that add value to these activities. NAYS believes this happens by:

Providing children with positive instruction and building basic motor skills
Training administrators (both professional and volunteer), volunteer coaches and officials on their roles and responsibilities
Having parents complete an orientation program to understand the important impact sports has on their child's development
Using the National Standards For Youth Sports as a guide for operating youth sports programs
Helping organizations understand the importance of conducting their youth sports programs in accordance with the Recommendations for Communities

History

Fred Engh, the President and CEO of NAYS, founded the organization in 1981. He has been involved in youth sports for more than 35 years as a coach, athletic director, sports educator and parent of seven children. In 1999, he wrote Why Johnny Hates Sports, a book that examines the state of youth sports in America and provides solutions to many of the problems plaguing organized programs.

Originally named the National Youth Sports Coaches Association (NYSCA), the organization initially focused on educating volunteer coaches on their wide range of responsibilities and the importance of meeting the needs of every child. NYSCA is a volunteer coaches training program that has been utilized by more than 3 million volunteer coaches worldwide. With the realization that volunteer coaches are only one aspect of the youth sports equation, NYSCA evolved into the National Alliance for Youth Sports in 1993.

Today, NAYS is the nation's leading youth sports educator and advocate with national programs that educate administrators, coaches, officials and parents about their roles and responsibilities in youth sports, in addition to offering youth development programs for children.

NAYS programs are provided at the local level through dynamic partnerships with more than 3,000 community-based organizations, which include parks and recreation departments, Boys & Girls Clubs of America, Police Athletic League, YMCA/YWCAs, Catholic Youth Organizations and other independent youth service groups throughout the country. NAYS also has a strong presence on military installations worldwide.

Timeline

Membership/Education
NAYS' membership/education programs are designed to properly train and prepare adults for their roles and responsibilities in youth sports.

NAYS Coach Training & Membership
The NAYS Coach Training & Membership is a membership program and has educated more than 3 million coaches since its inception in 1981. More than 3,000 community-based organizations offer this program. To become a member, coaches must (1) participate in an NAYS Coach Training interactive video, (2) successfully complete an exam and (3) sign a pledge committing to uphold the NAYS Code of Ethics for Coaches. Members not adhering to NAYS Code of Ethics for Coaches may have their membership revoked.

The web-designed course delivers an e-learning experience in six topic areas including what it means to be a coach, youth sports violence, conducting practices, game day, injury prevention, and nutrition and hydration.

NAYS Parent Orientation
The NAYS Parent Orientation is a membership program for parents promoting positive youth sports. The program began in 1999 and since that time, more than 100,000 families have become members. The NAYS Parent Orientation sets a standard for parent education by holding them accountable for themselves through the NAYS Code of Ethics for Parents and by helping them become positively involved in the youth sports experience.

To become a member, parents must (1) participate in a NAYS Parent Orientation interactive video and (2) sign a pledge committing to uphold the NAYS Code of Ethics for Parents.

NAYS League Director Training & Membership

The NAYS League Director Training & Membership is a membership program for volunteers responsible for the planning and implementation of out-of-school sports programs. To become a member, administrators must (1) participate in an NAYS League Director interactive video and (2) successfully complete the exam and (3) sign a pledge committing to uphold the NAYS Code of Ethics for League Directors.

NAYS Academy for Youth Sports Administrators

The NAYS Academy for Youth Sports Administrators is a 20-hour certification program that is designed to raise the professionalism of those delivering youth sports services. The Academy, either on-site or online, is the only way to earn Certified Youth Sports Administrator credentials (CYSA). During the Academy, faculty members cover such topics as youth sports philosophy, mission statements, policies and procedures, volunteer management, child abuse, parents, conflict management, insurance and risk management, and inclusion of children with disabilities. Currently, more than 4,000 CYSA's have graduated from the Academy.

NAYS Officials Training & Membership

The NAYS Officials Training & Membership is a membership program for volunteer game officials to better understand their roles and responsibilities when officiating youth sports. To become a member, officials must (1) participate in an NAYS Officials Training interactive video and (2) successfully complete the exam and (3) sign a pledge committing to uphold the NAYS Code of Ethics for Officials.

Youth Development

NAYS' youth development division consists of three youth sports programs – Start Smart Sports Development Programs, Hook A Kid On Golf and Ready, Set, RUN!

Start Smart Sports Development Programs

The Start Smart Sports Development Program brings parents and children (ages 3–5) together to learn pre-sports skills such as catching, kicking, throwing and batting. The Start Smart curriculum includes six lessons that teach parents how to work with their children to develop motor skills.

Start Smart is conducted in nearly 400 communities each year and has been mandated on every US Army installation around the world. Approximately 22,000 children participate in the Start Smart program annually.

Sports Specific Skill Development Programs

Start Smart offers sport-specific programs in baseball, soccer, basketball, golf, football and tennis, as well as a general sports development program. These programs teach parents and their children (ages 3–5) basic motor skill development and sport-specific skills while preparing the child for organized sports participation. Start Smart sport-specific programs teach children the most basic concepts of each sport.

Hook A Kid On Golf

Hook A Kid On Golf is the largest junior golf program in the country and has benefited nearly 75,000 participants and has been in more than 500 communities in the United States. Established in 1990, the program focuses on providing communities with a junior golf program with three levels: the Tee Level Introductory Clinic, Green Level Training Program and Challenge Golf League. Hook A Kid On Golf also hosts a junior golf event, the Traditions of Golf Challenge, which combines a team's playing score with rules, etiquette and history knowledge.

Tee Level Clinic

The Tee Level Clinic is designed as a 15-hour introductory program, typically spread out over 5 days, for children ages 8–13 who have no previous introduction to the game. Tee Level Clinic participants receive an introduction to the game as well as the necessary items to begin playing golf, including a starter set of clubs, upon completion of the program.

Green Level Training Program

The Green Level Training Program is for ages 8–15 and acts as a bridge between youngsters who have a basic introduction to the game and those who are ready for on-course play by providing practical training in the rules, etiquette and fundamentals of the game.

Challenge Golf Leagues

Challenge Golf Leagues, also for ages 8–15, provide an opportunity for team-oriented, recreation league play in which fun, learning and sportsmanship are stressed. Local leagues are modeled after other successful youth sports programs, which mean that parents and volunteers are trained as coaches and administrators.

Ready, Set, RUN!

Ready, Set, Run is a character building running program that trains kids ages 8–13 to participate in a 5k run.  This curriculum-based program equips kids with the physical training and goal-setting mentality needed to accomplish their running goals. Issues like enhancing confidence and self-esteem, respecting authority, dealing with peer pressure and fueling their bodies through proper nutrition are covered during the 12-week session.

Events

NAYS Youth Sports Congress

The NAYS Youth Sports Congress is a four-day educational training discussing new topics in the field of youth sports and is a preferred venue for all professionals involved in youth sports. The Congress allows administrators to discuss issues that are pertinent to youth sports and interact with other administrators to obtain practical information regarding their youth sports community as well as giving them the opportunity to earn continuing education.

NAYS joins forces with Athletic Business magazine annually in November to host the NAYS Youth Sports Congress in conjunction with the Athletic Business Show.

Traditions of Golf

The Traditions of Golf Challenge is an annual event that combines playing scores with rules, etiquette and history knowledge. Communities that conduct any level of the Hook A Kid On Golf program are eligible to participate in the Traditions of Golf Challenge. Each team's score from their round is combined with their "Traditions of Golf" score to determine the overall champion of the two-day tournament.

Past Winners Include:

1999 – West Palm Beach, Florida

2000 – Derby, Kansas

2001 – New Braunfels, Texas

2002 – Cuernavaca, Mexico

2003 – Cuernavaca, Mexico

2004 – Prospect Heights, Illinois

2005 – Prospect Heights, Illinois

2006 – Cuernavaca, Mexico

2007 – Prospect Heights, Illinois

2008 – West Palm Beach, Florida

2009 – Bloomington, Indiana

2010 – Prospect Heights, Illinois

2012 – Prospect Heights, Illinois

Awards

Excellence in Youth Sports Award

The Excellence in Youth Sports Award, is presented in partnership with Athletic Business magazine. The award recognizes organizations and agencies that conduct multifaceted sports programs. Five winners from these organizations are recognized each year. The organizations that apply include YMCA/YWCA, Boys & Girls Clubs of America, Jewish Community Center, Catholic Youth Organization, Parks and Recreation, Independent Leagues/Organizations and Military Installations.

Past Winners Include:

2000 – City of Greenacres, City of Tulsa, Hanscom Air Force Base, National Trial Parks & Recreation District, Patrick Air Force Base

2001 – Boys & Girls Club of Ellsworth Air Force Base, Falcon Trail Youth Center, Moody Air Force Base, City of North Miami Beach, City of Oregon

2002 – Eglin Air Force Base, Boys & Girls Club of Lackland Air Force Base, Orange County, South Suburban Parks & Recreation, YMCA at White Rock

2003 – Southeast YMCA of Greater Grand Rapids, Pleasant Dale Park District, Peoria Community Services, Child & Youth Services Fort Campbell, Kadena Youth Sports &Fitness

2004 – Boys & Girls Club of Green Bay, St. Andrews Parish Parks & Playground, Town of Hamburg Recreation Department, Tyndall Air Force Base, Schweinfut Army Base

2005 – City of Greensboro Parks & Recreation, City of Westerville Parks and Recreation Department, Gainesville Parks and Recreation, Mountain Home Air Force Base Youth Programs, Peterson Air Force Base Youth Center

2006 – Beale Air Force Base Youth Center, Indy parks and Recreation, City of Henderson Parks and Recreation, Hickam Air Force Base Youth Sports Program, Tinker Air Force Base Youth Center

2007 – Botetourt County Parks and Recreation Department, Fort Knox Child and Youth Services Sports and Fitness, Commander Fleet Activities Youth Sports, Misawa Youth Sports Program, St. Andrews Parish Parks and Playground Commission

2008 – City of Clearwater Parks and Recreation Department, City of Evans Parks and Recreation Department, Hickam Air Force Base Youth Sports Program, Tinker Air Force Base Youth Center, USAG Fort Belvoir Youth Sports

2009 – Andrews Air Force Base Youth Sports, Marine Corps Air Ground Combat Center, Sasebo Youth Sports, Town of Huntersville Parks & Recreation Department, USAG West Point Youth Sports & Fitness

2010 – Glynn County Parks & Recreation, MCAS-MCCS Miramar Youth Sports Programs, Oconee County Parks & Recreation, Spangdahlem Air Base Youth Sports, USAG Hawaii Youth Sports and Fitness

2011 – MCCS Cherry Point Youth Sports, Village of Evendale Recreation, Kaiserslautern Military Community Youth Sports and Fitness Program, Town of Westport Parks and Recreation, Joint Base Elmendorf-Richardson Youth Sports Program

2012 – Camp Lejeune Youth Sports, Churchville Recreation Council, Gwinnett County Parks and Recreation, Hillsborough County Parks, Recreation and Conservation Department's Youth Athletic Services, Joint Base McGuire-Dix-Lakehurst Youth Sports & Fitness Program

2013 – Botetourt County Parks, Recreation and Tourism, Fort Rucker Youth Sports and Fitness, Glynn County Recreation & Parks Department, Mecklenburg County Park and Recreation, Tinker Air Force Base Youth Programs

2014 - Dyess Air Force Base Youth Sports, JBLE Fort Eustis Youth Sports & Fitness Program, Jefferson City Parks, Recreation & Forestry, MCAS Miramar Youth Sports Program, Suffolk Parks & Recreation

2015 - Beale Air Force Base Youth Programs, Camp Pendleton Youth Sports, Cherokee Recreation & Parks Agency, Fort Leonard Wood Youth Sports & Fitness, Mountain Home Air Force Base Youth Sports Programs, NSA Bahrain Child and Youth Programs, Oconee County Parks and Recreation Department, US Army Garrison Hawaii, Youth Sports & Fitness Program

2016 - County of Los Angeles Department of Parks and Recreation – East Agency, Detroit Parks and Recreation Department, Naval Station Rota Spain Youth Sports and Fitness Program, Town of Cary Parks, Recreation & Cultural Resources, United States Army Garrison Stuttgart Youth Sports & Fitness

2017 - City of Henderson, Public Works, Parks and Recreation Department Sports Section, Fort Sill CYS Youth Sports and Fitness, Hurlburt Field Youth Sports Program, Joint Base Pearl Harbor–Hickam Youth Sports and Fitness, National Trail Parks and Recreation District

NAYS Volunteer Coach of the Year Award

The Coach of the Year award is given annually to a coach who has positively affected youth sports in his/her community and upholds the NAYS Code of Ethics for Coaches.

NAYS Youth Sports Parent of the Year Award

The Parent of the Year award is given annually to an outstanding parent that upholds the NAYS Code of Ethics for Parents. This parent encourages good sportsmanship, demands a safe and healthy environment for their child and others, demands their child's coach be trained, supports coaches, players, officials and administrators and respects and demonstrates good treatment of players, coaches, fans and officials.

Publications

SportingKid
SportingKid magazine is the official member publication of the National Alliance for Youth Sports (NAYS). The magazine is published four times a year and provided in both print and electronic versions. Each issue is packed with news, tips and expert information for volunteer coaches, parents, administrators and officials. SportingKid magazine was discontinued in 2015 and turned into a web platform called SportingKid Live.

Why Johnny Hates Sports
Written by Fred Engh, founder and president of the National Alliance For Youth Sports and an advocates of children's sports, this book examines organized sports from all angles. Engh wanted to discuss the ever-increasing number of children that are dropping out of organized sports because the system they play in is failing them. Engh explains how and why many of the original goals of youth leagues have been affected by today's win-at-all-cost attitudes and he documents the negative physical and psychological impact that parents, coaches and administrators can have on children. He also provides a wide variety of solutions to each and every one of the problems covered. Throughout the book Engh relates stories drawn from hundreds of real life experiences.

Coaching Baseball for Dummies
The book, written by the National Alliance for Youth Sports and Greg Bach, gives you advice on teaching essential skills to different age groups, running great practices and leading your team effectively during games. Along with providing all sorts of information on everything from how to teach bunting to the best ways to determine how to position players, there are tips for helping players relax and stay focused before the game, clever ways to ensure the season is a memorable one for all the right reasons, and special ways to end the season on a high note.

Coaching Basketball for Dummies
The book, written by the National Alliance for Youth Sports and Greg Bach, gives you innovative drills to teach your players a variety of offensive and defensive skills, as well as tips on all other aspects of coaching a youth basketball team. Readers will also find chapters on the best things to say to the team before a game, ways to stay realistic when coaching children, and how to properly evaluate the team, among many other areas.

Coaching Football for Dummies
The book, written by the National Alliance for Youth Sports and Greg Bach, assists work with children of all different ages and abilities, and handling game day responsibilities. There is much football information for safely teaching players offensive, defensive and special teams skills, as well as determining which positions kids are best suited for playing.

Coaching Hockey for Dummies
This book is written by Don MacAdam and Gail Reynolds. You'll find information on teaching the basics of offense, defense, special teams and goaltending, plus there are specific chapters devoted to working with beginning, intermediate and advanced players. There is also insight on refining your coaching strategies to meet the needs of your players and keeping them healthy and injury free.

Coaching Lacrosse for Dummies
The book, written by the National Alliance for Youth Sports and Greg Bach, helps you grasp the basics of lacrosse. You get advice on teaching skills to different age groups, determining positions for each player, promoting teamwork, keeping kids healthy and injury free, helping struggling players, and leading your team effectively during a game. You'll also find all sorts of drills to help beginners get a handle on the fundamentals of the game, as well as more complex drills to help advanced players take their skills to the next level.

Coaching Soccer for Dummies
The book, written by the National Alliance for Youth Sports and Greg Bach provides the proper technique for the game of soccer, regardless if it's a beginning level team looking to learn the basics, or a more advanced squad wanting to enhance their skills. The book also features a variety of drills to teach both fundamental and advanced skills, as well as tips for dealing with common coaching challenges that often pop up during the season.

Coaching Volleyball for Dummies
The book, written by the National Alliance for Youth Sports and Greg Bach helps you grasp the basics of volleyball. You get advice on teaching key skills to different age groups, running safe and effective practices, helping struggling players, encouraging good sportsmanship and leading your team with confidence during a match. You'll also find lots of information for teaching more advanced offensive and defensive skills to help raise your players' level of play.

Partnerships

Corporate Supporters
Gatorade, Nationwide Mutual Insurance Company, John Wiley & Sons, Enterprise Rent-A-Car

National Organizations
BlazeSports America, Boys & Girls Clubs of America, National Recreation and Park Association, Parent-Teacher Association, National Sports Center for the Disabled, Police Athletic League, United States Golf Association, Women's Sports Foundation, American Youth Football

Media
The National Alliance for Youth Sports has been featured in the following media.

ESPN, USA Today, Golf Channel, Sports Illustrated, U.S. News & World Report, CNN, ABC News, NBC News, Dateline NBC, Reader's Digest, Family Circle, Time magazine, Boston Globe, Chicago Tribune, Los Angeles Times, Parents Magazine, and The Washington Post.

References

External links
National Alliance for Youth Sports
NAYS Store
NAYS Coach Training
NAYS Parent Training
NAYS League Director Training
NAYS Officials Training
Academy for Youth Sports Administrators
Athletic Business
SportingKid Live

Non-profit organizations based in Florida
Sports organizations of the United States